Jumbo's Clown Room, often shorthanded to Jumbo's, is a "bikini bar" (non-nude strip club) located on Hollywood Boulevard in the East Hollywood  neighborhood of Los Angeles, California. The bar opened on July 27, 1970, and later became a strip club in 1982.

Overview
Jumbo's Clown Room has been described as embodying the burlesque dance spirit more than its counterparts in Hollywood and farther west. It has also been described as being "infamous" and as somewhat of a dive bar with unusual clown images hung on the walls that provides some inexpensive beer options while also hosting exotic dancers that perform striptease and pole dancing. Some of the workers there also perform lap dances. Rather than having an on-premises disk jockey, the dancers choose their own songs using a jukebox. Jumbo's serves beer and cocktails. Today, it is a family-owned and operated business.

The Cyber Clown Girls show
After the COVID-19 pandemic began in California in early 2020, Jumbo's had to temporarily close its doors to the public in March 2020 due to the State of California mandating the closure of indoor restaurants and bars across the state. The club's exotic dancers could not perform, and as an alternative to this, some of the dancers at the club created an internet-based performance show named the "Cyber Clown Girls". The website enabled the dancers to realize revenue and to expand their reach outside of the Los Angeles area. An admission ticket purchase is required, and dancer tips are paid by customers using payment applications such as Cash App and Venmo. As of March 2022, the Cyber Clown Girls were continuing to perform and broadcast shows.

Some of the dancers on the website donated some of their earnings to various LGBTQ+ and reproductive justice organizations. By March 2021, the Cyber Clown Girls had donated over $25,000 to various causes, non-profits and organizations. Charity recipients have included the Los Angeles Food Bank, Black Lives Matter groups, Gender Justice L.A. and Reform L.A. Jails, among others.

In March 2021, in response to increased violence toward Asian-Americans occurring in the United States, the Cyber Clown Girls presented an all-Asian online show in support of the National Asian Pacific American Women's Forum chapter in the U.S. state of Georgia, which works "to empower AAPI women and girls" and the Butterfly Asian and Migrant SW Network, an organization that works to assist Asian and migrant sex workers.

In popular culture
Musician and actress Courtney Love once worked as a dancer at Jumbo's Clown Room. Musician Lemmy of Motörhead sometimes patronized the establishment. Anthony Bourdain had described himself as a "fan" of the club and had stated that it was one of his favorite bars. In 2017, Ellen DeGeneres performed a skit at Jumbo's for The Ellen DeGeneres Show as "Karla Kardashian", a fictional character that has been described as "a lesser-known fourth Kardashian sister". The heavy metal band Rusty Eye filmed two music videos at Jumbo's in 2020. Circa 2020, country musician Jaime Wyatt filmed the video for the song "Neon Cross" at Jumbo's.

See also

 List of strip clubs

References

External links
 
 Dolls Kill | Cyber Clown Girls - Interview w/ Gabmonster 

Buildings and structures in Hollywood, Los Angeles
Strip clubs in the United States
Burlesque theatres
Dive bars in California